Lame horse may refer to:

Lameness (equine), a wide variety of locomotion disorders in horses and other equines
The 2009 Perm Lame Horse club fire